The following is a list of notable deaths in November 2004.

Entries for each day are listed alphabetically by surname. A typical entry lists information in the following sequence:
 Name, age, country of citizenship at birth, subsequent country of citizenship (if applicable), reason for notability, cause of death (if known), and reference.

November 2004

1
James Hanson, Baron Hanson, 82, British industrialist and Conservative life peer, cancer.
Hatem Kamil, Iraqi deputy governor of Baghdad, shot.
Terry Knight, 61, American rock manager and producer (Grand Funk Railroad), shot during domestic dispute.
Mark Ledford, 43/4, American trumpeter, singer and guitarist.
Mac Dre, 34, American rapper, drive-by shooting.

2
Sheikh Zayed bin Sultan Al Nahyan, 86, Emirati politician, president of UAE (1971–2004), Emir of Abu Dhabi.
Gustaaf Joos, 81, Belgian Cardinal.
Gerrie Knetemann, 53, Dutch cyclist (world champion, 1978), heart attack.
Basil Thompson, 67, American ballet master.
Theo van Gogh, 47, Dutch filmmaker, television presenter, and author, shot.

3
Janet Backhouse, 66, English manuscripts curator at the British Museum, cancer.
James H. Binger, 88, American lawyer, entrepreneur and philanthropist.
Joe Bushkin, 87, American swing era jazz pianist, pneumonia.
Sergejs Žoltoks, 31, Latvian ice hockey player (Minnesota Wild, Montreal Canadiens, Boston Bruins), heart failure due to cardiac arrhythmia.

4
Mohammed Bello, 74, Nigerian jurist, Chief Justice (1987–1995).
Robert Heaton, 43, British songwriter and drummer (New Model Army), pancreatic cancer. 
Richard Hongisto, 67, American former sheriff of San Francisco and Cleveland, Ohio, heart attack.
Ellen Meloy, 58, American author.
Yasutomi Nishizuka, 72, Japanese biochemist, discovered Protein Kinase C (PKC).
Dee Phillips, 85, American baseball player (Cincinnati Reds, Boston Braves).
Delbert Plett, 56, Russian-Canadian lawyer and historian, known for the history of Russian Mennonites in Canada.

5
Harold de Andrado, 76, Sri Lankan cricket writer.
Donald Jones, 72, American-born Dutch actor, comedian, singer and dancer, first black Dutch celebrity, heart attack.
Basil McIvor, 76, Northern Irish politician and educationalist.
Nili Natkho, 22, Circassian-Israeli basketball player, car accident.

6
Fred Dibnah, 66, British steeplejack and television presenter, prostate cancer.
Michel T. Halbouty, 95, American geologist, petroleum engineer, and wildcatter.
Pete Jolly, 72, American jazz pianist and accordionist.
Elizabeth Rogers, 70, American actress (Star Trek), multiple strokes and lung cancer.
Marion Shilling, 93, American film actress, leading lady in 1930s B-Western films.
Patrick F. Taylor, 67, American businessman, heart infection.
Johnny Warren, 61, Australian soccer player, coach and ethnic community advocate, lung cancer.
Déborah Weil, 47, Mexican Olympic diver

7
Bobby Clatterbuck, 72, American football player.
Howard Keel, 85, American actor and singer (Kiss Me Kate, Annie Get Your Gun, Dallas), colon cancer.
Gibson Kente, 72, South African playwright, AIDS.
Herman Postma, 71, American scientist and educational leader (director of Oak Ridge National Laboratory).

8
Eddie Charlton, 75, Australian snooker player.
Chandler Harper, 90, American golfer.
Ruby de Mel, 86, Sri lankan actress.
Lennox Miller, 58, Jamaican Olympic athlete, cancer.
Sharad Panday, 70, Indian heart surgeon.
Melba Phillips, 97, American physicist and educator, coronary artery disease.
G. Sakunthala, 72, Indian film actress.

9
Iris Chang, 36, American historian and author (The Rape of Nanking), suicide.
Emlyn Hughes, 57, British footballer (Liverpool F.C., England), brain tumour.
Ed Kemmer, 83, American actor.
Stieg Larsson, 50, Swedish author (Millennium).

10
Elizabeth Chater, 94, Canadian author of novels and poetry.
Katy de la Cruz, 97, Filipino singer.
Şeref Görkey, 91, Turkish footballer and manager.
Walter Pukutiwara, Aboriginal artist.
Erna Rosenstein, 91, Polish surrealist painter and poet, arterial sclerosis.

11
Dayton Allen, 85, American comedian, voice of Deputy Dawg and Mayor Phineas T. Bluster.
Yasser Arafat, 75, Palestinian PLO leader, President of the Palestinian Authority, cause disputed, possible poisoning.
J. P. Blecksmith, 24, American military officer, K.I.A.
Shirley Briggs, 86, American artist, photographer, writer, and naturalist.
Richard Dembo, 56, French César Award-winning director, intestinal obstruction.
Sam Kogan, 58, Russian actor, director, and acting teacher, cancer.
Raymond Murray, 91, United States Marine Corps officer.

12
Lelio Marino, 69, Italian-born American entrepreneur, owner of Modern Continental group.
Usko Meriläinen, 74, Finnish composer.
Norman Rose, 88, American radio and TV actor (All My Children, voice of Juan Valdez).
Stanisław Skalski, 89, Polish World War II fighter ace. 
Mike Smith, 62, British cricketer, heart attack.

13
John Balance, 42, British musician (Coil), fall.
Ellen Fairclough, 99, Canadian politician, first female cabinet minister.
Russell "Ol' Dirty Bastard" Jones, 35, American rapper, drug overdose.
Harry Lampert, 88, American comic book and advertising artist, co-creator of The Flash, author of instructional books on contract bridge, cerebral hemorrhage.
Domenic Mobilio, 35, Canadian soccer player, heart attack.
Carlo Rustichelli, 87, Italian film composer.
Don Sharpe, 79, British sound editor (Aliens, Batman, Sleuth), Oscar winner (1987).
Roy Thomas, 54, Canadian aboriginal artist, cancer.
Keith Weller, 58, English footballer (Millwall. Leicester City), cancer.

14
Michel Colombier, 65, French composer, cancer.
David Stanley Evans, 86, Welsh astronomer.
Jesse Gonder, 68, American baseball player (New York Yankees, Cincinnati Reds, New York Mets, Milwaukee Braves, Pittsburgh Pirates).
Matilda White Riley, 93, American gerontologist.
Shiva Shankar, 72, Nepali singer, composer and actor.
Evelyn West, 80, American burlesque stripper, pin-up girl and actress.

15
Elmer L. Andersen, 96, American businessman, governor of Minnesota (1961–1963).
Sir Bob Cooper, 68, Northern Irish politician.
Colin Coulthard, 83, British Royal Air Force officer.
John Morgan, 74, Welsh-born Canadian comedian, former member of the Royal Canadian Air Farce, heart attack.
Jack Schmidt, 80, Canadian professional ice hockey player (Boston Bruins).

16
Yves Berger, 73, French writer and editor.
Massimo Freccia, 98, Italian-American conductor.
Richard Frey, 84, Austria-Chinese military physician and politician.
B. C. Gowrishankar, 54, Indian cinematographer and screenwriter.
Ken Hannam, 75, Australian film and television director, cancer.
Margaret Hassan, 59, British aid worker, chief of the humanitarian relief organization CARE International, presumed killed by hostage takers in Iraq.
Reed Irvine, 82, American economist, founder of Accuracy in Media, complications of stroke.
Goh Sin Tub, 77, Singaporean writer.

17
Floyd Baker, 88, American baseball player (St. Louis Browns, Chicago White Sox, Washington Senators, Boston Red Sox, Philadelphia Phillies).
George Curtis, 84, English football player and coach.
Mikael Ljungberg, 34, Swedish wrestler and Olympic gold medalist, suicide by hanging.
Alexander Ragulin, 63, Soviet ice hockey player, 10-time IIHF World Champion and three-time Olympic gold medalist.
Lena Townsend, 93, British politician, leader of the Inner London Education Authority (1969–1970).

18
Danilo Anderson, 38, Venezuelan prosecutor, bombing.
Juan Carlos Aramburu, 92, Argentinian Roman Catholic Archbishop of Buenos Aires (1975–1990), Cardinal since 1976.
Robert Bacher, 99, American nuclear physicist, co-leader of the Manhattan Project.
Frank Baldwin, 75, American baseball player (Cincinnati Redlegs).
Bobby Frank Cherry, 75, American criminal, convicted in the 16th Street Baptist Church bombing, cancer.
Cy Coleman, 76, American composer of Broadway musicals, heart attack.
Alfred Maseng, Vanuatuan president (1994, 2004) and foreign minister (1995–1996).
N. Mathrubootham, 60, Indian psychiatrist and actor.
Antonio Pocovi, 82, Argentine Olympic sprinter (men's 400 metres and men's 4 × 400 metres relay at the 1948 Summer Olympics).
George Scholes, 75, Canadian Olympic hockey player (bronze medal winner in men's ice hockey at the 1956 Winter Olympics).

19
Langdon Gilkey, 85, American Christian Protestant Ecumenical theologian.
Helmut Griem, 72, German film actor (Cabaret).
Trina Schart Hyman, 65, American illustrator of children's books, complications of breast cancer.
Don MacMillan, 76, Australian Olympic athlete.
Terry Melcher, 62, American musician and producer, son of Doris Day, melanoma.
Brian Traxler, 37, American baseball player.
Sir John Vane, 77, British Nobel Prize-winning pharmacologist (Medicine, 1982).

20
Celso Furtado, 84, Brazilian economist, heart attack.
David Grierson, 49, Canadian CBC radio and television host.
Janine Haines, 59, Australian politician, former leader of the Australian Democrats, after long illness.
Ancel Keys, 100, American scientist, co-inventor of the K-ration.
Ian Lewis, 69, Irish cricketer.
Dénes Pócsik, 64, Hungarian Olympic water polo player (winner of three Olympic medals: 1964, 1968, 1972).
Jenny Ross, 42, British punk rock singer.
Jimmy Tapp, 86, Canadian television personality and voice actor (The Mighty Hercules).

21
Willi Illbruck, 77, German industrialist.
Georges Morel, 66, French Olympic rower.
Michael Ricketts, 81, British cricketer and Army officer.
Mashhoor bin Saud bin Abdulaziz Al Saud, 50, Saudi prince.
Noel Perrin, 77, American essayist, MSA.
Uwe Scholz, 45, German ballet dancer, director and choreographer.

22
Reginald Coates, 84, British civil engineer.
Leo Dee, 73, American artist and teacher.
Arthur Hopcraft, 71, British author (The Football Man), sports journalist, and screenwriter.
Niall McInerney, 55, Irish hurler.
Don Puddy, 67, American NASA engineer, manager and flight director in the Mission Control Center at Johnson Space Center.

23
Frances Chaney, 89, American actress, Alzheimer's disease.
John Cordle, 92, British politician.
Rafael Eitan, 75, Israeli politician and former chief of staff, drowned.
Karl Enderlin, 81, Swiss figure skater.
Eris Paton, 76, New Zealand cricketer.
Miriam Schlein, 78, American author.
Joseph J. Sisco, 85, American diplomat, known for playing a major role in Secretary of State Henry Kissinger's shuttle diplomacy.
Harrison Stafford, 92, American professional football player (University of Texas, New York Giants).

24
Larry Brown, 53, American author and novelist, apparent heart attack.
Arthur Hailey, 84, British-Canadian author, declining health following stroke.
Joseph Hansen, 81, American mystery author.
Taiji Kase, 75, Japanese karateka.
Janet Kear, 71, British ornithologist.
Harry Moniba, 67, Liberian politician, Vice President of Liberia (1986–1990).
Walter Pavlicek, 78, Austrian Olympic swimmer (men's 200 metre breaststroke at the 1948 Summer Olympics).
John Tosi, 88, American football player.
James Wong, 64, Hong Kong lyricist, actor, director, talk show host and author, lung cancer.

25
Rachel Attas, 70, Israeli actress, voice actress and singer, cancer.
David Bailey, 71, American actor (Another World, Passions), drowned.
Bob Haney, 78, American comic book writer (Teen Titans, Doom Patrol, Aquaman).
Elijah Mwangale, 65, Kenyan politician.
Ed Paschke, 65, American artist, heart failure.
Denis Richards, 94, British historian.
Ross Robinson, 76, Australian rules football player.
Carl Silvestri, 61, American professional football player (University of Wisconsin, St. Louis Cardinals, Atlanta Falcons).

26
Bill Alley, 85, Anglo-Australian cricketer (Somerset, New South Wales) and test cricket umpire.
Philippe de Broca, 71, French film director, cancer.
Tom Haller, 67, American MLB All-Star catcher (San Francisco Giants, Los Angeles Dodgers, Detroit Tigers) and manager (Giants), after long illness.
C. Walter Hodges, 95, British illustrator, author and Shakespeare scholar.
Maude Lloyd, 96, South African ballerina.
Hans Schaffner, 95, Swiss politician and Federal Councilor (1960s), President of the Confederation (1966).

27
Samuel Chinque, 96, British writer, publisher, activist, and trade unionist.
Jack Daniels, 92, British automotive designer, cancer.
John Dunn, 70, Scottish BBC Radio 2 disc jockey, cancer.
Gunder Hägg, 85, Swedish middle-distance runner.
Billy James Hargis, 79, American Christian minister, missionary and anti-Communist activist.

28
Leroy F. Aarons, 70, American journalist, founder of the NLGJA, cancer.
Nermin Vlora Falaschi, 83, Albanian intellectual and feminist.
Cris Huerta, 69, Portuguese actor.
Connie Johnson, 81, American baseball player (Chicago White Sox, Baltimore Orioles).
Hans Christian Nielsen, 88, Danish Olympic cyclist (men's team pursuit cycling at the 1936 Summer Olympics).
Molly Weir, 94, Scottish actress.

29
John Drew Barrymore, 72, American actor, member of the Barrymore family, father of Drew Barrymore.
Harry Danning, 93, American MLB All-Star catcher (New York Giants).
Irwin Donenfeld, 78, American DC Comics executive.
John Monckton, 49, British city financier, murdered.
Inger Nordbø, 89, Danish-Norwegian Olympic diver (women's 3 metre springboard and women's 10 metre platform at the 1936 and 1948 Summer Olympics).
Bernard Robinson, 92, English footballer (Norwich City F.C.).
Jack Shields, 74, Canadian member of Parliament (House of Commons representing Fort McMurray—Athabasca, Alberta).
Molly Weir, 94, British TV and radio actress.
Karl Wölfl, 90, Austrian Olympic cyclist.

30
Pierre Berton, 84, Canadian author and journalist, heart failure.
Bill Brown, 73, Scottish goalkeeper (Tottenham Hotspur, Scotland).
Alexei Khvostenko, 64, Russian poet, artist and musician, heart failure.
Johnny Quigley, 69, Scottish footballer.
Seung Sahn, 77, Korean zen master, founder of Kwan Um School of Zen.
Elsa Stansfield, 59, Scottish video artist.

References 

2004-11
 11